Myriospora elegans is a species of lichenized fungi in the family Acarosporaceae.

References

External links 

 Myriospora elegans at Mycobank

Acarosporales
Lichen species
Lichens described in 1860